Wild Money is a 1937 American comedy film directed by Louis King and written by Paul Gallico, Edward T. Lowe, Jr., Marguerite Roberts and Eddie Welch. The film stars Edward Everett Horton, Louise Campbell, Lynne Overman, Lucien Littlefield, Esther Dale and Porter Hall. The film was released on July 9, 1937, by Paramount Pictures.

Plot

Cast 
Edward Everett Horton as P.E. Dodd
Louise Campbell as Judy McGowan
Lynne Overman as Perry Brown
Lucien Littlefield as Bill Hawkins
Esther Dale as Jenny Hawkins
Porter Hall as Bill Court
Benny Baker as Al Vogel
Ruth Coleman as Mrs. West
Louis Natheaux as Cyrus K. West
Billy Lee as Malcolm West
Howard M. Mitchell as Sheriff Jones
William Burress as Spreckett
Gertrude Short as Miss Green

References

External links 
 

1937 films
Paramount Pictures films
American comedy films
1937 comedy films
Films directed by Louis King
American black-and-white films
1930s English-language films
1930s American films